Hurtova Lhota is a municipality and village in Havlíčkův Brod District in the Vysočina Region of the Czech Republic. It has about 300 inhabitants.

History
The first written mention of Hurtova Lhota is from 1436.

References

Villages in Havlíčkův Brod District